This is the discography of Welsh rock band the Alarm.

Albums

Studio albums

Live albums

Soundtrack albums

Compilation albums

Box sets

Video albums

Other albums

EPs

Singles

Notes

References

Discographies of British artists
Rock music group discographies
New wave discographies